Ronald Wearmouth (born 17 July 1950) is a former Australian rules footballer. Wearmouth gave great service to the Collingwood Football Club over a 13 year career that included four Grand Finals (1977 (twice), 1979 & 1980). He represented Victoria against ACT in 1978. As a rover he was pacy, energetic and deceptively robust.

References

External links 
 
 

Australian rules footballers from Victoria (Australia)
Collingwood Football Club players
Victorian State of Origin players
1950 births
Living people